Traves may refer to:

 Traves, Piedmont in Italy
 Traves, Haute-Saône in France